Strandvallen is a multi-use stadium in Hällevik, Sweden.  It is currently used mostly for football matches and is the home stadium of Mjällby AIF.  The stadium holds 7,000 people and was built in 1953.

References

External sources

Strandvallen

Football venues in Sweden
Mjällby AIF
Buildings and structures in Blekinge County
Sports venues completed in 1953
1953 establishments in Sweden